Highway 376 is a highway in the Canadian province of Saskatchewan. It runs from Highway 14 near Asquith to Highway 324. Highway 376 passes through the villages of Maymont, and Richard. It also provides access to Eagle Creek Regional Park and Glenburn Regional Park.

The highway is paved between Highways 14 and 40 and gravel north of Highway 40.

Major intersections 
From south to north:

See also 
Roads in Saskatchewan
Transportation in Saskatchewan

References 

376